Ermano Batista Filho (21 December 1937 – 10 July 2022) was a Brazilian lawyer and politician. A member of the Liberal Party and later the Brazilian Social Democracy Party, he served in the Legislative Assembly of Minas Gerais from 1991 to 2007.

Batista Filho died from a traffic collision in Governador Valadares on 10 July 2022, at the age of 84.

References

1937 births
2022 deaths
Liberal Party (Brazil, 1985) politicians
Liberal Party (Brazil, 2006) politicians
Brazilian Social Democracy Party politicians
Members of the Legislative Assembly of Minas Gerais
20th-century Brazilian politicians
21st-century Brazilian politicians
Road incident deaths in Brazil